Berkner Island (also known as the Berkner Ice Rise or as Hubley Island) is an Antarctic ice rise, where bedrock below sea level has caused the surrounding ice sheet to create a dome. If the ice cap were removed, the island would be underwater. It is surrounded by the Filchner-Ronne Ice Shelf. It lies in the overlapping portion of the Argentine and the British Antarctic territorial claims.

It is characterized by two domes, Reinwarthhöhe in the north, and Thyssenhöhe in the south. It is indented by three bays on the eastern side, which are, from north to south, the McCarthy Inlet, the Roberts Inlet, and the Spilhaus Inlet. The southern tip is named the Mulvaney Promontory. Gould Bay is on the north coast.

History
Berkner Island was discovered by members of the United States-International Geophysical Year party from Ellsworth Station during the 1957–1958 season. It was named by the United States Advisory Committee on Antarctic Names for American physicist Lloyd Berkner, engineer with the Byrd Antarctic Expedition (1928–1930).

Since 1990, Berkner Island has been a jumping off point for a number of long distance polar expeditions. Ben Saunders has planned an unsupported journey from the island to the South Pole and back, and it was the start point of Henry Worsley's attempt to cross the Antarctic in 2015–16.

In the 1994–1995 field season the British Antarctic Survey (BAS), Alfred Wegener Institute and the Forschungsstelle für Physikalische Glaziologie of the University of Münster cooperated in a project drilling ice cores on the North (Reinwarthhöhe) and South (Thyssenhöhe) Domes of the island. Between 2002 and 2005 a  core was drilled through to the bed at Thyssenhöhe by a team from BAS and the Laboratoire de Glaciologie et Géophysique de l’Environnement, Grenoble, and radar work in 2005 and 2010-11 confirmed the existence of the Raymond Effect.

Important Bird Area
The size of the colony was estimated as about 8,000 individual birds, based on 2009 satellite imagery.

See also
 Composite Antarctic Gazetteer
 List of Antarctic islands south of 60° S
 SCAR
 Territorial claims in Antarctica

References

External links
 

Important Bird Areas of Antarctica
Penguin colonies
 
British Antarctic Territory
Filchner-Ronne Ice Shelf
Ice rises of Queen Elizabeth Land